Waste Connections of Canada  (formerly Progressive Waste Solutions) is a garbage collection company, providing non-hazardous solid waste collection, recycling, composting, renewable energy production and landfill disposal services to commercial, industrial, municipal and residential customers. In 2016, Progressive Waste Solutions merged with Waste Connections, Inc. (TSX/NYSE) becoming the third largest solid waste management company in North America with a network of operations in 39 states and five provinces. In Canada, operations were rebranded to Waste Connections of Canada (in British Columbia, Alberta, Manitoba and Ontario) and Enviro Connexions (in Quebec).

Formerly known as 

 BFI Canada
 Waste Services Inc.
 Progressive Waste Solutions

See also 
 Browning-Ferris Industries
 Allied Waste Industries
 Republic Services

References

External links

SEDAR Profile

Companies formerly listed on the Toronto Stock Exchange
Companies formerly listed on the New York Stock Exchange
Companies based in Toronto
Canadian companies established in 2000
Waste management companies of Canada
2017 mergers and acquisitions
Canadian subsidiaries of foreign companies
Waste companies established in 2000